Joseph Walter Nega (born September 11, 1960) is an American lawyer who serves as a judge of the United States Tax Court. He formerly served as senior legislation counsel of the Joint Committee on Taxation of the United States Congress.

Biography 

Nega was born on September 11, 1960 in Chicago. He received a Bachelor of Science in Accounting from DePaul University. He received a Juris Doctor from DePaul University College of Law. He received a Master of Laws in Taxation from Georgetown University Law Center. He has served on the Joint Committee on Taxation staff since 1985, starting as a Legislation Attorney from 1985 to 1989. From 1989 to 2008, he served as Legislation Counsel to the committee. From 2008 to 2013, he served as Senior Legislation Counsel. His primary areas of responsibility were the individual income tax, tax exemption requirements for state and local bonds, tax credit bonds and employment taxes.

Tax Court service 

On May 9, 2013, President Barack Obama nominated Nega to serve a fifteen-year term as a Judge of the United States Tax Court, to the seat vacated by Judge Thomas B. Wells, who took senior status on January 1, 2011.  His nomination was confirmed by the United States Senate on August 1, 2013. He received his commission on September 4, 2013. His commission will expire on September 3, 2028, at which time his fifteen-year term will end.

References

1960 births
Living people
21st-century American judges
DePaul University College of Law alumni
Georgetown University Law Center alumni
Judges of the United States Tax Court
Lawyers from Chicago
United States Article I federal judges appointed by Barack Obama